Cathayia is a genus of snout moths. It was described by George Hampson in 1901 and is known from Spain, Australia, China and Borneo.

Species
 Cathayia insularum (Speidel & Schmitz, 1991)
 Cathayia lineata (Turner, 1942)
 Cathayia obliquella Hampson in Ragonot, 1901
 Cathayia purpureotincta Hampson, 1917

References

Galleriini
Pyralidae genera
Taxa named by George Hampson